Zagori is a municipality and a region in Epirus, Greece.

Zagori may also refer to:
 Zagori, Albania, an ex municipality in southern Albania 
 Zagoria (newspaper), a newspaper published in Albania
 Donald S. Zagoria (born 1928), American author

See also
 
 Zagora (disambiguation)
 Zagore (disambiguation)
 Zagorje (disambiguation)
 Záhorie, a region in Slovakia